In the South African government, the Minister of Health is the member of the national Cabinet responsible for the Department of Health, and therefore for national health policy and the administration of public health. The position is of particular importance in South Africa because of the massive impact of the AIDS pandemic in the country.

List of Health Cabinet Ministers

See also
 Health minister

References